Dario Simões Zamboni (born 29 December 1975 in Jaboticabal) is a Brazilian biologist whose research concerns microbial pathogenesis, innate immunity, and infectious diseases. Currently, he is a professor at the University of São Paulo.

He is a member of the Brazilian Academy of Sciences.

References

External links
Zamboni's profile at Google Scholar

1975 births
Living people
People from Jaboticabal
Brazilian biologists
Members of the Brazilian Academy of Sciences
Academic staff of the University of São Paulo